The 2005–06 New Orleans/Oklahoma City Hornets season was the team's 4th season in the NBA. They began the season hoping to improve upon their 18–64 record from the previous season (worst in the Western Conference that year). They finished the season with a 38–44 record, missing the playoffs for the second year in a row.

Before the commencement of training camp, the City of New Orleans was hit by Hurricane Katrina. With the New Orleans Arena partly damaged and the city's infrastructure in need of repair the Hornets signed a deal to play most of their games in Oklahoma City, becoming the New Orleans/Oklahoma City Hornets for this season. In Oklahoma City, the Hornets enjoyed sell out crowds at the Ford Center.

The addition of draft pick Chris Paul resulted in the team competing for a playoff spot. In January and February, the club played winning basketball despite losing Chris Andersen to a two-year suspension for illegal drugs. Paul showed the poise and play making skills of a veteran finishing second in steals and seventh in assists as he posted a terrific 3.34 assist to turnover ratio, while leading all rookies with 16.1 ppg.

On March 8 the Hornets returned to New Orleans with a near sell out crowd on hand to watch the Hornets lose to the Los Angeles Lakers 113–107. In March, the Hornets went into a tail spin winning just 3 of 14 games. The Hornets went on to finish in 4th place in their division. Chris Paul was named Rookie of the Year.

Draft picks

Roster

Regular season

Standings

Game log

|- style="background:#cfc;"
| 1
| November 1
| Sacramento
| 93–67
| P. J. Brown (20)
| David West (11)
| Speedy Claxton & Chris Paul (4)
| Ford Center 19,163
| 1–0
|- style="background:#fcc;"
| 2
| November 2
| @ Cleveland
| 87–109
| Speedy Claxton (16)
| Chris Andersen (8)
| Boštjan Nachbar (6)
| Quicken Loans Arena  20,562
| 1–1
|- style="background:#cfc;"
| 3
| November 5
| @ Houston
| 91–84
| P. J. Brown (18)
| P. J. Brown (13)
| Claxton & Paul (8)
| Toyota Center  15,875
| 2–1
|- style="background:#fcc;"
| 4
| November 9
| Orlando
| 83–88
| Speedy Claxton (24)
| P. J. Brown (10)
| Speedy Claxton (6)
| Ford Center  18,508
| 2–2
|- style="background:#fcc;"
| 5
| November 12
| Dallas
| 103–109
| Chris Paul (26)
| P. J. Brown (7)
| Speedy Claxton (7)
| Ford Center  19,163
| 2–3
|- style="background:#fcc;"
| 6
| November 15
| @ Miami
| 102–109 (OT)
| P. J. Brown (24)
| P. J. Brown (12)
| Chris Paul (10)
| American Airlines Arena 19,600
| 2–4
|- style="background:#fcc;"
| 7
| November 16
| Denver
| 81–91
| Chris Paul (18)
| Brown, Paul, & West (9)
| Kirk Snyder (5)
| Ford Center  18,442
| 2–5
|- style="background:#cfc;"
| 8
| November 18
| Atlanta
| 95–92
| Chris Paul (25)
| Chris Andersen (18)
| Chris Paul (12)
| Ford Center  17,554
| 3–5
|- style="background:#cfc;"
| 9
| November 19
| @ Orlando
| 98–95
| David West (34)
| Andersen & West (8)
| Chris Paul (8)
| TD Waterhouse Centre  14,489
| 4–5
|- style="background:#fcc;"
| 10
| November 21
| @ Philadelphia
| 91–103
| David West (20)
| David West (9)
| Chris Paul (6)
| Wachovia Center  12,452
| 4–6
|- style="background:#cfc;"
| 11
| November 23
| Minnesota
| 84–80
| David West (22)
| David West (13)
| Chris Paul (8)
| Ford Center  19,163
| 5–6
|- style="background:#cfc;"
| 12
| November 26
| @ Seattle
| 105–99
| David West (21)
| Desmond Mason & Paul (7)
| Chris Paul (10)
| Key Arena16,371
| 6–6
|- style="background:#fcc;"
| 13
| November 28
| @ Golden State
| 83–99
| Chris Paul (15)
| David West (11)
| Speedy Claxton (9)
| Oakland Arena  16,270
| 6–7
|- style="background:#cfc;"
| 14
| November 30
| @ Denver
| 102–95
| Desmond Mason (26)
| P. J. Brown (12)
| Chris Paul (9)
| Pepsi Center 15,603
| 7–7

|- style="background:#cfc;"
| 15
| December 2
| Philadelphia
| 88–86
| David West (22)
| P. J. Brown (14)
| Chris Paul (9)
| Ford Center  19,163
| 8–7
|- style="background:#fcc;"
| 16
| December 3
| @ Dallas
| 88–97
| Chris Paul (25)
| Brown & Paul (6)
| Chris Paul (5)
| American Airlines Center  19,651
| 8–8
|- style="background:#fcc;"
| 17
| December 6
| @ Memphis
| 73–89
| Mason & West (15)
| Chris Andersen (10)
| Paul, J. R. Smith, & Claxton (4)
| FedEx Forum  13,271
| 8–9
|- style="background:#fcc;"
| 18
| December 7
| Boston
| 87–101
| David West (29)
| Chris Paul (10)
| Chris Paul (6)
| Ford Center  18,753
| 8–10
|- style="background:#fcc;"
| 19
| December 9
| @ Portland
| 95–98 (OT)
| Speedy Claxton (27)
| Chris Paul (7)
| Chris Paul (10)
| Rose Garden  12,305
| 8–11
|- style="background:#fcc;"
| 20
| December 11
| @ Sacramento
| 100–110
| Chris Paul (18)
| P. J. Brown (8)
| Chris Paul (12)
| ARCO Arena 17,317
| 8–12
|- style="background:#cfc;"
| 21
| December 12
| @ Phoenix
| 91–87
| J. R. Smith (26)
| J. R. Smith (10)
| Chris Paul (7)
| America West Arena  15,547
| 9–12
|- style="background:#cfc;"
| 22
| December 14
| LA Clippers
| 102–89
| J. R. Smith (21)
| David West (12)
| Chris Paul (8)
| Ford Center 17,490
| 10–12
|- style="background:#fcc;"
| 23
| December 16
| Phoenix
| 88–101
| Chris Paul (25)
| Brown & West (13)
| Chris Paul (6)
| Pete Maravich Assembly Center 7,302
| 10–13
|- style="background:#cfc;"
| 24
| December 18
| San Antonio
| 89–76
| David West (19)
| Chris Paul (12)
| Chris Paul (9)
| Ford Center 19,297
| 11–13
|- style="background:#fcc;"
| 25
| December 21
| @ Minnesota
| 69–88
| Chris Paul (15)
| P. J. Brown (9)
| Speedy Claxton (4)
| Target Center 14,454
| 11–14
|- style="background:#fcc;"
| 26
| December 23
| @ Milwaukee
| 94–101
| David West (27)
| David West (18)
| Chris Paul (8)
| Bradley Center 16,824
| 11–15
|- style="background:#cfc;"
| 27
| December 28
| Houston
| 92–90
| J. R. Smith (16)
| Brown & West (7)
| Chris Paul (15)
| Ford Center 19,205
| 12–15
|- style="background:#fcc;"
| 28
| December 29 
| @ San Antonio
| 84–111
| David West (18)
| P. J. Brown (6)
| Chris Paul (7)
| AT&T Center 18,797
| 12–16
|- style="background:#fcc;"
| 29
| December 31
| Dallas
| 90–95
| David West (18)
| David West (10)
| Chris Paul (10)
| Ford Center 19,170
| 12–17

|- style="background:#cfc;"
| 30
| January 2
| Charlotte
| 103–86
| Chris Paul (24)
| Mason & West (9)
| Chris Paul (11)
| Ford Center  17,683
| 13–17
|- style="background:#cfc;"
| 31
| January 4
| Miami
| 107–92
| Desmond Mason (24)
| Mason & West (7)
| Chris Paul (9)
| Ford Center  19,326
| 14–17
|- style="background:#cfc;"
| 32
| January 6
| Portland
| 90–80
| Kirk Snyder (22)
| David West (13)
| Speedy Claxton (7)
| Ford Center  18,995
| 14–18
|- style="background:#fcc;"
| 33
| January 7
| @ Atlanta
| 93–101
| Speedy Claxton (29)
| David West (9)
| Kirk Snyder (4)
| Philips Arena  11,332
| 14–19
|- style="background:#fcc;"
| 34
| January 10
| Detroit
| 86–96
| David West (20)
| P. J. Brown (9)
| Chris Paul (5)
| Ford Center  19,260
| 15–19
|- style="background:#cfc;"
| 35
| January 13
| Sacramento
| 90–76
| David West (19)
| Chris Paul (8)
| Speedy Claxton (8)
| Lloyd Noble Center11,343
| 16–19
|- style="background:#cfc;"
| 36
| January 14
| @ Houston
| 86–80
| Chris Paul (17)
| P. J. Brown (10)
| Chris Paul (5)
| Toyota Center 14,724
| 17–19
|- style="background:#cfc;"
| 37
| January 16
| @ Charlotte
| 107–92
| Chris Paul (24)
| David West (11)
| Chris Paul (6)
| Charlotte Bobcats Arena  15,303
| 18–19
|- style="background:#cfc;"
| 38
| January 18
| Memphis
| 87–79
| Chris Paul (16)
| David West (14)
| Chris Paul (9)
| Ford Center  14,554
| 19–19
|- style="background:#fcc;"
| 39
| January 20
| @ Washington
| 99–110
| Chris Paul (28)
| David West (7)
| Chris Paul (11)
| Verizon Center  19,062
| 19–20
|- style="background:#cfc;"
| 40
| January 21
| @ New York
| 109–98
| Chris Paul (27)
| P. J. Brown (9)
| Chris Paul (13)
| Madison Square Garden 19,763
| 20–20
|- style="background:#fcc;"
| 41
| January 23
| @ Boston
| 78–91
| David West (21)
| P. J. Brown (8)
| Chris Paul (6)
| TD Banknorth Garden  14,473
| 20–21
|- style="background:#fcc;"
| 42
| January 25
| San Antonio
| 68–84
| Rasual Butler & West (15)
| P. J. Brown (9)
| Chris Paul (4)
| Ford Center  19,289
| 20–22
|- style="background:#cfc;"
| 43
| January 28
| @ Memphis
| 95–86
| Speedy Claxton (20)
| David West (12)
| Chris Paul (8)
| FedExForum 16,228
| 21–22
|- style="background:#cfc;"
| 44
| January 30
| Milwaukee
| 94–93
| David West (24)
| David West (15)
| Chris Paul (9)
| Ford Center  18,197
| 22–22

|- style="background:#cfc;"
| 45
| February 1
| Chicago
| 100–95
| Chris Paul (25)
| Brown & West (6)
| Chris Paul (13)
| Ford Center  19,163
| 23–22
|- style="background:#cfc;"
| 46
| February 4
| LA Lakers
| 106–90
| Desmond Mason (21)
| P. J. Brown (9)
| Chris Paul (13)
| Ford Center  19,334
| 24–22
|- style="background:#fcc;"
| 47
| February 6
| @ New Jersey
| 91–99
| Speedy Claxton (23)
| Mason & Paul (7)
| Chris Paul (13)
| Continental Airlines Arena  13,998
| 24–23
|- style="background:#cfc;"
| 48 
| February 8
| Seattle
| 109–102
| David West (26)
| David West (10)
| Kirk Snyder (12)
| Ford Center  18,807
| 25–23
|- style="background:#cfc;"
| 49
| February 10
| New York
| 111–100
| David West (21)
| David West (10)
| Speedy Claxton (11)
| Ford Center  19,163
| 26–23
|- style="background:#cfc;"
| 50
| February 11
| @ Minnesota
| 100–94
| Claxton & Snyder (28)
| Desmond Mason (9)
| Speedy Claxton (7)
| Target Center  15,933
| 27–23
|- style="background:#cfc;"
| 51
| February 13
| Washington
| 97–96
| David West (19)
| David West (9)
| Speedy Claxton (10)
| Ford Center  18,678
| 28–23
|- style="background:#cfc;"
| 52
| February 15
| Portland
| 102–86
| Kirk Snyder (22)
| Rasual Butler (9)
| Chris Paul (7)
| Ford Center  19,051
| 29–23
|- style="background:#fcc;"
| 53
| February 21
| @ Indiana
| 75–97
| Chris Paul (27)
| Desmond Mason (7)
| Chris Paul (6)
| Conseco Fieldhouse  14,108
| 29–24
|- style="background:#fcc;"
| 54
| February 22
| Utah
| 100–95
| Chris Paul (18)
| Aaron Williams (13)
| Chris Paul (7)
| Ford Center  18,368
| 29–25
|- style="background:#cfc;"
| 55
| February 25
| @ Utah
| 100–95
| Chris Paul (23)
| Linton Johnson (11)
| Chris Paul (8)
| EnergySolutions Arena  18,471
| 30–25
|- style="background:#cfc;"
| 56
| February 26
| @ Portland
| 102–86
| David West (22)
| Marc Jackson (8)
| Chris Paul (8)
| Rose Garden  12,860
| 31–25
|- style="background:#fcc;"
| 57
| February 28
| @ Seattle
| 104–114
| Chris Paul (25)
| Chris Paul (7)
| Chris Paul (14)
| Key Arena  15,115
| 31–26

|- style="background:#fcc;"
| 58
| March 1
| @ LA Clippers
| 67–89
| Desmond Mason (20)
| P. J. Brown (11)
| Chris Paul (12)
| Staples Center 16,157
| 31–27
|- style="background:#fcc;"
| 59
| March 6
| Phoenix
| 88–101
| David West (20)
| David West (8)
| Chris Paul (11)
| Ford Center  19,207
| 31–28
|- style="background:#fcc;"
| 60
| March 8
| LA Lakers
| 107–113
| David West (25)
| Kirk Snyder (6)
| Chris Paul (10)
| Ford Center  17,744
| 31–29
|- style="background:#fcc;"
| 61
| March 10
| Indiana
| 90–92
| David West (20)
| Chris Paul (7)
| Chris Paul (8)
| Ford Center  18,506
| 31–30
|- style="background:#fcc;"
| 62
| March 12
| New Jersey
| 84–95
| Chris Paul (17)
| P. J. Brown (8)
| Chris Paul (7)
| Ford Center  19,198
| 31–31
|- style="background:#fcc;"
| 63
| March 14
| @ San Antonio
| 81–96
| Jackson & Paul (16)
| Rasual Butler (8)
| Chris Paul (7)
| AT&T Center  18,797
| 31–32
|- style="background:#fcc;"
| 64
| March 18
| Denver
| 94–109
| David West (24)
| P. J. Brown (10)
| Chris Paul (10)
| New Orleans Arena  17,912
| 31–33
|- style="background:#cfc;"
| 65
| March 21
| LA Clippers
| 120–108
| Rasual Butler (32)
| David West (11)
| Chris Paul (9)
| New Orleans Arena  16,799
| 32–33
|- style="background:#fcc;"
| 66
| March 23
| Houston
| 92–93
| David West (14)
| David West (11)
| Speedy Claxton (10)
| Ford Center  19,163
| 32–34
|- style="background:#fcc;"
| 67
| March 24
| Chicago
| 82–96
| Chris Paul (13)
| Brown & Butler (9)
| Speedy Claxton (6)
| United Center  21,793
| 32–35
|- style="background:#fcc;"
| 68
| March 26
| @ LA Lakers
| 67–89
| David West (23)
| David West (10)
| Claxton & Paul (6)
| Staples Center  18,997
| 32–36
|- style="background:#fcc;"
| 69
| March 26
| @ Utah
| 80–104
| Rasual Butler (15)
| P. J. Brown (8)
| Chris Paul (7)
| EnergySolutions Arena  17,437
| 32–37
|- style="background:#cfc;"
| 70
| March 29
| @ Golden State
| 86–85
| Rasual Butler (20)
| Marc Jackson (8)
| Chris Paul (7)
| Oakland Arena  16,885
| 33–37
|- style="background:#cfc;"
| 71
| March 31
| Memphis
| 107–102
| Marc Jackson (24)
| Linton Johnson (8)
| Speedy Claxton (8)
| Ford Center  18,817
| 34–37

|- style="background:#cfc;"
| 72
| April 2
| @ Toronto
| 120–113 (2 OT)
| Chris Paul (24)
| Chris Paul (12)
| Claxton & Paul (12)
| Air Canada Centre 15,079
| 35–37
|- style="background:#fcc;"
| 73
| April 4
| @ Detroit
| 93–101
| Paul & West (24)
| Jackson, Johnson, & West (6)
| Chris Paul (10)
| The Palace of Auburn Hills  22,076
| 35–38
|- style="background:#cfc;"
| 74
| April 5
| Golden State
| 114–109 OT
| Speedy Claxton (21)
| Butler & Paul (11)
| Chris Paul (16)
| Ford Center  18,169
| 36–38
|- style="background:#cfc;"
| 75
| April 7
| Toronto
| 95–89
| David West (19)
| David West (9)
| Chris Paul (8)
| Ford Center  18,854
| 37–38
|- style="background:#fcc;"
| 76
| April 8
| @ Dallas
| 77–101
| Rasual Butler (14)
| Brown & Butler (7)
| Chris Paul (5)
| American Airlines Center  20,336
| 37–39
|- style="background:#fcc;"
| 77
| April 10
| Cleveland
| 101–103
| Chris Paul (22)
| P. J. Brown (10)
| Chris Paul (5)
| Ford Center  19,187
| 37–40
|- style="background:#cfc;"
| 78
| April 12
| Seattle
| 104–99
| Chris Paul (21)
| Marc Jackson (14)
| Chris Paul (6)
| Ford Center  18,607
| 38–40
|- style="background:#fcc;"
| 79
| April 14
| Utah
| 104–105
| David West (31)
| David West (12)
| Chris Paul (7)
| Ford Center  19,163
| 38–41
|- style="background:#fcc;"
| 80
| April 16
| @ Sacramento
| 79–96
| Chris Paul (12)
| Brandon Bass (7)
| Chris Paul (7)
| ARCO Arena  17,317
| 38–42
|- style="background:#fcc;"
| 81
| April 17
| @ Phoenix
| 78–115
| Jackson & Paul (11)
| Linton Johnson (7)
| Chris Paul (5)
| US Airways Arena  18,442
| 38–43
|- style="background:#fcc;"
| 82
| April 19
| LA Lakers
| 95–115
| P. J. Brown (16)
| Marc Jackson (13)
| Chris Paul (7)
| Staples Center  18,997
| 38–44

Player statistics

Bold leads team. Minimum of ten games started. 
Reference:

Awards and records

Awards
Chris Paul, NBA Rookie of the Year Award
Chris Paul, NBA All-Rookie Team 1st Team

Free agents

Additions

Subtractions

See also
2005–06 NBA season

References

New Orleans Hornets seasons
Sports in Oklahoma City